The 2020 Phoenix Super LPG Fuel Masters season was the fifth season of the franchise in the Philippine Basketball Association (PBA).

Draft

Roster

Philippine Cup

Eliminations

Standings

Game log

|-bgcolor=bbffbb
| 1
| October 12
| Meralco
| W 116–98
| Matthew Wright (36)
| Jason Perkins (9)
| Matthew Wright (6)
| AUF Sports Arena & Cultural Center
| 1–0
|-bgcolor=bbffbb
| 2
| October 15
| NorthPort
| W 110–105
| Jason Perkins (31)
| Jason Perkins (12)
| Matthew Wright (9)
| AUF Sports Arena & Cultural Center
| 2–0
|-bgcolor=edbebf
| 3
| October 19
| TNT
| L 91–110
| Matthew Wright (31)
| Jason Perkins (9)
| JC Intal (5)
| AUF Sports Arena & Cultural Center
| 2–1
|-bgcolor=edbebf
| 4
| October 21
| Ginebra
| L 71–86
| Jason Perkins (15)
| Jason Perkins (8)
| Matthew Wright (6)
| AUF Sports Arena & Cultural Center
| 2–2
|-bgcolor=bbffbb
| 5
| October 23
| Magnolia
| W 91–84
| Matthew Wright (23)
| Jason Perkins (12)
| JC Intal (5)
| AUF Sports Arena & Cultural Center
| 3–2
|-bgcolor=bbffbb
| 6
| October 26
| NLEX
| W 114–110
| Matthew Wright (28)
| Abueva, Perkins (13)
| Calvin Abueva (7)
| AUF Sports Arena & Cultural Center
| 4–2
|-bgcolor=edbebf
| 7
| October 29
| Alaska Aces
| L 97–105
| Matthew Wright (27)
| Matthew Wright (9)
| Calvin Abueva (5)
| AUF Sports Arena & Cultural Center
| 4–3
|-bgcolor=bbffbb

Game log

Note: The PBA Board of Governors announced that games will be postponed for the meantime due to the coronavirus outbreak.

Transactions

Free agent signings

Trades

References

Phoenix Super LPG Fuel Masters seasons
Phoenix Super LPG Fuel Masters